Frankies 457 Spuntino is an Italian restaurant and olive oil company located in Brooklyn, New York established in 2004 by Frank Castronovo and Frank Falcinelli.

According to Laura Shunk of The Village Voice, the restaurant is considered one of the fourteen essential Italian restaurants in Brooklyn and is known as pioneers of the current crostini trend in New York. The chefs were James Beard Foundation Award semi-finalists for Outstanding Restaurateur in 2015.

Frankies 457 Olive Oil

It produces Frankies 457 Extra Virgin Olive Oil made from organically grown olives in Sicily is considered a favorite by locals and chef, Matty Matheson.

See also
 List of Italian restaurants

References

External links

Italian-American culture in New York City
Italian restaurants in New York City
Restaurants in Brooklyn
2004 establishments in New York City
Restaurants established in 2004